Bunker Hill is a 2008 western drama film written and directed by Kevin Willmott.

Plot
Peter Salem, a former Wall Street executive recently released from prison, returns to his ex-wife and children in the small town of Bunker Hill, Kansas. Soon after he arrives, the town's electricity and power are shut off, and there is no way to communicate with authorities outside of town. The town's militant past is reawakened and forces coalesce to protect citizens from an unseen enemy. The town's fear leads to the creation of a posse of gunmen, resulting in torture, illegal searches and eventually, murder, against which Salem must stand.

Cast
 James McDaniel as Peter Salem
 Saeed Jaffrey as Mr. Farook
 Laura Kirk as Halle 
 Kevin Geer as McLain
 Blake Robbins as Delmar
 Scott Allegrucci as Deputy Ross
 Ranjit Arab as Nadim
 RJ Smith as a PA
 Lindsay Smith as extra

Production
Willmott produced and directed this film from a script he wrote with Greg Hurd. It was shot in the town of Nortonville, Kansas.

References

External links

 Official site

2008 films
2008 Western (genre) films
American Western (genre) films
Films set in Kansas
Films shot in Kansas
2008 drama films
Films directed by Kevin Willmott
2000s English-language films
2000s American films